Desmond Amsterdam is a Guyanese boxer. He participated at the 2022 South American Games in the boxing competition, being awarded the bronze medal in the men's light heavyweight event. He previously participated at the 2021 AIBA World Boxing Championships in the middleweight event and at the 2022 Commonwealth Games in the men's middleweight event, winning no medal in either.

References

External links 

Living people
Place of birth missing (living people)
Year of birth missing (living people)
Guyanese male boxers
Middleweight boxers
Light-heavyweight boxers
Boxers at the 2022 Commonwealth Games
Competitors at the 2022 South American Games
South American Games medalists in boxing
South American Games bronze medalists for Guyana